Karlovka may refer to:
Karlivka, known as Karlovka until the 1950s
Karlovka, Donetsk - a village in the Maryinka district, Donetsk Oblast, Ukraine. 
Karlovka, name of several rural settlements in Russia